The 2018 Supercopa de España was the 35th edition of the Supercopa de España, an annual football super cup contested by the winners of the previous season's La Liga and Copa del Rey competitions.

The match was played between the Copa del Rey runners-up, Sevilla, and the winners of the 2017–18 Copa del Rey and 2017–18 La Liga, Barcelona, making it a rematch of the 2018 Copa del Rey Final.	

Unlike all the previous editions, it was a single match hosted at a neutral venue. This year's venue was Stade Ibn Batouta in Tangier, Morocco.

The match was broadcast on Spanish RTVE public television network La 1, earning an average 36.5% share and 4,785,000 viewers.

Match

Details

References

2018–19 in Spanish football cups
August 2018 sports events in Africa
Sevilla FC matches
FC Barcelona matches
Sport in Tangier
International club association football competitions hosted by Morocco
2018 in Moroccan sport
2018